North Dakota's HB 1572, otherwise known as the Personhood of Children Act, was a bill in the North Dakota Legislature which aimed to "provide equality and rights to all human beings at every stage of biological development". This step could have eventually eliminated all types of induced abortion for nearly any reason in the state of North Dakota.

This legislation, sponsored by State Representative Dan Ruby, passed the North Dakota House of Representatives on February 17, 2009 by a vote of 51–41, but was defeated in the North Dakota Senate on April 3, 2009 in a 29 to 16 vote.

References

External links
ND HB 1572

Abortion in the United States
Personhood
2009 in North Dakota
History of women in North Dakota